Cheltenham is a single-member electoral district for the South Australian House of Assembly. Named after the suburb of the same name, it is a 17.5 km² suburban electorate in Adelaide's north-west, taking in the suburbs of Albert Park, Alberton, Beverley, Cheltenham, Findon, Hendon, Pennington, Queenstown, St Clair, Woodville, Woodville North, Woodville Park, Woodville South, Woodville West, and part of Rosewater. The Cheltenham electorate is inside the federal-level electorate of Port Adelaide.

Cheltenham was created in the 1998 electoral distribution as a safe Labor seat, replacing the abolished seat of Price. In August 2001 the 17-year Price incumbent Murray De Laine was defeated in a factional preselection in favour of future premier Jay Weatherill. De Laine subsequently contested the 2002 election as an independent with 9.7% of the primary vote.

In the 2016 electoral boundary redistribution, the suburbs of Beverley and Woodville Park were added to the seat from Croydon district, while Athol Park was lost to Croydon district, Royal Park was lost to Lee district and portions of Port Adelaide and Rosewater shifted into Port Adelaide district.

The current member is Joe Szakacs of the Labor Party. Szakacs was elected in the  2019 Cheltenham state by-election on 9 February, replacing former premier Jay Weatherill.

Members for Cheltenham

Election results

Notes

References
 ECSA profile for Cheltenham: 2018
 ABC profile for Cheltenham: 2018
 Poll Bludger profile for Cheltenham: 2018

Electoral districts of South Australia
1998 establishments in Australia